Pirili may refer to:
Pirili, Agstafa, Azerbaijan
Pirili, Kurdamir, Azerbaijan